The England cricket team toured the West Indies between 25 January 2009 and 3 April 2009. Initially, it was intended that they play four Test matches, one Twenty20 International and five One Day Internationals against the West Indies cricket team. However, the abandonment of the Second Test due to the conditions of the field at the Sir Vivian Richards Stadium in Antigua led to the rapid inclusion of an additional game staged at the Antigua Recreation Ground, resulting in a five-match, rather than four-match Test series. The West Indies regained the Wisden Trophy by winning the Test series 1–0. They also won the Twenty20 match, but England won the ODI series 3–2.

Build-up 
Despite recent turmoils, England went into the series as firm favourite. The players claimed confidence, the ICC rankings placed them comfortably ahead of their adversaries, and the pundits were, under the circumstances, fairly buoyant. In The Daily Telegraph, Geoffrey Boycott opined that, with a fit Andrew Flintoff, England ought to prevail easily:

I am not saying it will be a walkover. The one thing England do need is a fit Andrew Flintoff, throughout all the four Tests. If Freddie goes down injured, the odds for the series will turn around dramatically.

Test series

1st Test

2nd Test

3rd Test

4th Test

5th Test

T20I series

Only T20I

ODI series

1st ODI

2nd ODI

3rd ODI

4th ODI

5th ODI

Tour matches

St Kitts Invitational XI v England XI

First-class: West Indies A v England XI

Barbados Cricket Association President's XI v England XI

West Indies Players' Association XI v England XI

References

2008-09
2009 in English cricket
2009 in West Indian cricket
2008–09 West Indian cricket season
International cricket competitions in 2008–09